is a Japanese actor who is affiliated with Seinenza Theater Company. He played the role of Nobuharu Udo (Kyoryu Blue) in the 2013 Super Sentai TV series Zyuden Sentai Kyoryuger and Takeshi Goutokuji (Kamen Rider Shirowe) in the 2022 Kamen Rider TV series Kamen Rider Geats.

Biography
In 2002, Kinjo graduated from high school and moved to Tokyo. He worked at a part-time job in a tavern, such as a security guard. Kinjo started as an actor in 2010 and mainly played in stage. In 2013, he appeared in Zyuden Sentai Kyoryuger as Nobuharu Udo/Kyoryu Blue. Kinjo expressed his joy and said "I become a hero in this year .... well" with regard to his appearances when he was 29 years old at the time.

Personal life
On January 3, 2019, he announced his marriage to actress Sayaka Kotani.

Filmography

TV series

Anime

Films

Dub

References

External links
 Official profile at Seinenza Theater Company 
 
 Yamato Kinjo at Wiki Infromer

Japanese male actors
1983 births
Living people
People from Naha
People from Okinawa Prefecture